The 2019–20 Austrian Basketball Superliga was the inaugural season of the Basketball Superliga, the newly established top tier league in Austrian basketball. It was the 74th season of the first tier of basketball in Austria. The Kapfenberg Bulls entered the season as the defending national champions winning the 2018–19 ÖBL season.

The season was ended prematurely because of the COVID-19 pandemic.

Format
Teams first play each other in the regular season home and away. After this, teams ranked 1–6 and 7-10 are divided in two groups to qualify for the playoffs. In the playoffs, the best eight teams play each other for the national championship in best-of-five series. The two lowest placed teams play against the top two teams of the Basketball Zweite Liga (B2L).

Teams

Venues and locations

On 6 June 2019, eight licenses were confirmed. Raiffeisen Panthers Fürstenfeld and Vienna DC Timberwolves confirmed later they met the requirements.

On 6 August 2019, it was announced Panthers Fürstenfeld did not receive a licence while SKN St. Pölten entered the league.

Personnel and sponsorship

Regular season

Standings

Results

Second stage

Standings group 1–6
Points from the first half of the season were divided by 2.

Results group 1–6

Standings group 7–10
Only matches from involved teams are counted in the table.

Results group 7–10

Austrian clubs in European competitions

Austrian clubs in international competitions

References

External links
Official website 

Österreichische Basketball Bundesliga seasons
Austrian
Lea